Warrior Marks: Female Genital Mutilation and the Sexual Blinding of Women is a 1993 book by Alice Walker with Pratibha Parmar, who made an award-winning documentary of the same name. Following on from her 1992 novel Possessing the Secret of Joy, Walker undertakes a journey to parts of Africa where clitoridectomy is still practised. Warrior Marks is a harrowing work as Walker interviews women who have had the operation done and finally interviews a woman—circumcised herself—who performs the operation.

References

Books by Alice Walker
Womanist novels
1993 non-fiction books
Works about female genital mutilation